Ardminish (Scottish Gaelic: Aird Mhèanais) is the sole village on the Isle of Gigha in the Inner Hebrides, in Argyll and Bute, Scotland, and considered its "capital". It is connected to the mainland through a regular ferry service that runs to Tayinloan. In 1961 it had a population of 84.

Ardminish has the pier, post office and shop.

The name Ardminish means "The headland of the narrow point", from a mixture of Gaelic and Norse.

References

Villages in Argyll and Bute
Villages in the Inner Hebrides
Ports and harbours of Scotland
Isle of Gigha